Los Angeles International Airport , commonly referred to as LAX (with each letter pronounced individually), is the primary international airport serving Los Angeles, California and its surrounding metropolitan area. LAX is the closest airport to the Westside and the South Bay.

The airport is operated by Los Angeles World Airports (LAWA), a branch of the Los Angeles city government, that also operates Van Nuys Airport for general aviation.

In 2019, LAX handled 88,068,013 passengers, making it the world's third-busiest and the United States' second-busiest airport following Hartsfield–Jackson Atlanta International Airport. As the largest and busiest international airport on the U.S. West Coast, LAX is a major international gateway to the United States, and also serves a connection point for passengers traveling internationally (such as East and Southeast Asia, Australasia, Mexico and Central America). The airport holds the record for the world's busiest origin and destination airport, because relative to other airports, many more travelers begin or end their trips in Los Angeles than use it as a connection. It is also the only airport to rank among the top five U.S. airports for both passenger and cargo traffic. LAX serves as a major hub or focus city for more passenger airlines than any other airport in the United States.

Although LAX is the busiest airport in the Greater Los Angeles Area, several other airports, including Hollywood Burbank Airport, John Wayne Airport (Orange County), Long Beach Airport, Ontario International Airport, and San Bernardino International Airport serve the region.

History

In 1926, the Los Angeles City Council and the Chamber of Commerce recognized the need for the city to have its own airport to tap into the fledgling, but quickly growing aviation industry. Several locations were considered, but the final choice was a  field in the southern part of Westchester. The location had been promoted by real estate agent William W. Mines, and Mines Field as it was known, had already been selected to host the 1928 National Air Races. On August 13, 1928 the city leased the land and the newly formed Department of Airports began converting the fields once used to grow wheat, barley and lima beans into dirt landing strips.

The airport opened on October 1, 1928 and the first structure, Hangar No. 1, was erected in 1929. The building still stands at the airport, remaining in active use and listed on the National Register of Historic Places. Over the next year, the airport started to come together: the dirt runway was replaced with an all-weather surface and more hangars, a restaurant, and a control tower were built. On June 7, 1930, the facility was dedicated and renamed Los Angeles Municipal Airport.

The airport was used by private pilots and flying schools, but the city’s vision was that Los Angeles would become the main passenger hub for the area. However, the airport failed to entice any carriers away from the established Burbank Airport or the Grand Central Airport in Glendale.

World War II put a pause on any further development of the airport for passenger use. Before the United States entered the war, the aviation manufacturers located around the airport were busy providing aircraft for the allied powers, while the flying schools found themselves in high demand. In January 1942, the military assumed control of the airport, stationing fighter planes at the airfield and building naval gun batteries in the ocean dunes to the west.

Meanwhile, airport managers published a master plan for the land, and in early 1943 and convinced voters to back a $12.5 million bond for airport improvements. With a plan and funding in place, the airlines were finally convinced to make the move.

After the end of the war, four temporary terminals were quickly erected on the north side of the airport and on December 9, 1946, American Airlines, Trans World Airlines (TWA), United Airlines, Southwest Airways and Western Airlines began passenger operations at the airport, with Pan American Airways (Pan Am) joining the next month. The airport was renamed Los Angeles International Airport in 1949.

The temporary terminals would remain in place for 15 years but quickly became inadequate, especially as air travel entered the "jet age" and other cities invested in modern facilities. Airport leaders once again convinced voters to back a $59 million bond on June 5, 1956.

The current layout of the passenger facilities was established in 1958 with a plan to build a series of terminals and parking facilities, arranged in the shape of the letter U, in the central portion of the property. The original plan called for the terminal buildings connected at the center of the property by a huge steel-and-glass dome. The dome was never built, but a smaller Theme Building built in the central area became a focal point for people coming to the airport.

The first of the new passenger buildings, Terminals 7 and 8, were opened for United Airlines on June 25, 1961, following opening festivities that lasted several days. Terminals 2, 3, 4, 5 and 6 opened later that same year.

A major expansion of the airport came in the early 1980s, ahead of the 1984 Summer Olympic Games. In November 1983 a second-level roadway was added, Terminal 1 opened in January 1984 and the Tom Bradley International Terminal opened in June 1984. The original terminals also received expansions and updates in the 1980s.

Since 2008, the airport has been undergoing another major expansion. All of the terminals are being refurbished, and the Tom Bradley International Terminal was completely rebuilt, with a West Gates concourse added. Outside of the terminal area, a 4,300 stall parking structure, a Los Angeles Metro Rail station, and a consolidated rental car facility are being built. All will be connected to the terminal area by the LAX Automated People Mover. In the near future, airport managers plan to build two more terminals (0 and 9). All together, these projects are expected to cost of $14 billion and bring LAX's total gates from 146 to 182.

The "X" in LAX
Before the 1930s, US airports used a two-letter abbreviation and at that time, "LA" served as the designation for Los Angeles Airport. With the rapid growth in the aviation industry, in 1947, the identifiers expanded to three letters and "LA" received an extra letter to become "LAX." The letter "X" does not otherwise have any specific meaning in this identifier. "LAX" is also used for the Port of Los Angeles in San Pedro and by Amtrak for Union Station in downtown Los Angeles.

Infrastructure

Airfield 
24R/06L and 24L/06R (designated the North Airfield Complex) are north of the airport terminals, and 25R/07L and 25L/07R (designated the South Airfield Complex) are south of the airport terminals.

LAX is located with the Pacific Ocean to the west and residential communities on all other sides. Since 1972, Los Angeles World Airports has adopted a "Preferential Runway Use Policy" to minimize noise levels in the communities closest to LAX.

Typically the loudest operations at an airport are from departing aircraft (as engines operate at full power), so during daytime hours (6:30am to midnight), LAX prefers to operate under the "Westerly Operations" air traffic pattern, named for the prevailing west winds. Under "Westerly Operations", departing aircraft take off to the west (over the ocean), and arriving aircraft approach from the east. To reduce noise to areas north and south of the airport, LAX prefers to use the "inboard" runways (06R/24L and 07L/25R) closest to the central terminal area and further from residential areas for departures, and the "outboard" runways are preferred for arrivals. Historically, over 90% of flights have used the "inboard" departures and "outboard" arrivals scheme.

During nighttime hours, when there are fewer aircraft operations and residential areas tend to be more noise sensitive, additional changes are made to reduce noise. Between 10pm and 7am, air traffic controls try to use the "outboard" runways as little as possible and between midnight and 6:30am the air traffic pattern shifts to "Over-Ocean Operations" where departing aircraft continue to take off to the west, but arriving aircraft also approach from the west (over the ocean).

There are times when the Over-Ocean and Westerly operations are not possible, particularly when the winds originate from the east, typically during inclement weather and Santa Ana winds events. When that happens, the airport shifts to the non-preferred "Easterly Operations" air traffic pattern where departing aircraft take off to the east, and arriving aircraft approach from the west.

The South Airfield Complex tends to see more operations than the North, due to a larger number of passenger gates and air cargo operations.

Terminals

LAX has nine passenger terminals with a total of 146 gates arranged in the shape of the letter U or a horseshoe that are identified by numbers except for the Tom Bradley International Terminal. The Midfield Satellite Concourse, now renamed the West Gates, an expansion for international flights reached through the Tom Bradley Terminal, opened on May 1, 2021.

Theme Building

The distinctive Theme Building in the Googie style was built in 1961 and resembles a flying saucer that has landed on its four legs. A restaurant with a sweeping view of the airport is suspended beneath two arches that form the legs. The Los Angeles City Council designated the building a Los Angeles Historic-Cultural Monument in 1992. A $4 million renovation, with retro-futuristic interior and electric lighting designed by Walt Disney Imagineering, was completed before the Encounter Restaurant opened there in 1997 but is no longer in business. Visitors are able to take the elevator up to the observation deck of the "Theme Building", which had previously been closed after the September 11, 2001 attacks for security reasons. A memorial to the victims of the 9/11 attacks is located on the grounds, as three of the four hijacked planes were originally destined for LAX.  The Bob Hope USO expanded and relocated to the first floor of the Theme Building in 2018.

Future developments
LAWA currently has several plans to modernize LAX, for $14 billion. These include terminal and runway improvements, which will enhance the passenger experience, reduce overcrowding, and provide airport access to the latest class of very large passenger aircraft; this would bring LAX's total gates from 146 to 182.

These improvements include:
 Reconstruction of Terminals 1 (completed), 2 (completed), 3 (completed), 4 (under construction), and 6 (under construction)
Construction of Terminal 1.5, a connector building between terminals 1 and 2, with a post-security bridge between the terminals and a bus gate to take passengers to boarding gates in the Tom Bradley International Terminal (completed)
Reconstruction of Tom Bradley International Terminal (completed)
Construction of the West Gates at Tom Bradley International Terminal adding 15 gates (completed)
Expansion of the West Gates at Tom Bradley International adding 8 temporary gates (under construction)
Construction of the LAX Automated People Mover (APM) (under construction)
Construction of the Economy Parking, a 4,300-stall parking structure with passenger pick-up/drop-off areas, connected to the terminal area by the APM (completed)
Construction of the Intermodal Transportation Facility – East (ITF-East), also known as LAX/Metro Transit Center station, a Los Angeles Metro Rail and bus station, connected to the terminal area by the APM (under construction)
Construction of a consolidated rental car facility, connected to the terminal area by the APM (under construction)
Construction of Concourse 0 east of Terminal 1, adding 9 gates and an additional international arrivals facility (planned)
Construction of Terminal 9 east of Sepulveda Boulevard, adding 12 gates and an additional international arrivals facility (planned)

Airlines and destinations

Passenger

Cargo

Traffic and statistics

It is the world's fourth-busiest airport by passenger traffic and eleventh-busiest by cargo traffic, serving over 87 million passengers and 2 million tons of freight and mail in 2018. It is the busiest airport in the state of California, and the second-busiest airport by passenger boardings in the United States. In terms of international passengers, the second busiest airport for international traffic in the United States, behind only JFK in New York City.
The number of aircraft movements (landings and takeoffs) was 700,362 in 2017, the third most of any airport in the world.

Top domestic destinations

Top international destinations

Airline market share

Ground transportation and access

Transiting between terminals
In the secure area of the airport, tunnels or above-ground connectors link terminals 4, 5, 6, 7, 8, and B (Tom Bradley International Terminal). Connectors are currently under construction between terminals 1, 2, 3, and B.

LAX Shuttle route A operates in a counter-clockwise loop around the Central Terminal Area, providing frequent service for connecting passengers. However, connecting passengers who use these shuttles must leave and then later re-enter security.

LAX Shuttle routes
LAX operates several shuttle routes to connect passengers and employees around the airport area:

Route A Terminal Connector operates in a counter-clockwise loop around the Central Terminal Area, providing frequent service for connecting passengers. However, connecting passengers who use these shuttles must leave and then later re-enter security.

Route C City Bus Center connects the Central Terminal Area and the LAX City Bus Center which is served by transit buses from Beach Cities Transit, Culver CityBus, Los Angeles Metro, Santa Monica Big Blue Bus and Torrance Transit. Buses on this route also serve the Employee South Lot.

Route E Economy Parking connects the Central Terminal Area and the West Intermodal Transportation Facility, the airport's economy parking garage.

Buses also stop at the "Remote Rental Car Depot," a bus stop served by shuttles to smaller rental car companies.

Route X LAX Employee Lots connects the Central Terminal Area and the Employee Parking Lots. The route has three service patterns, the East Lot route only stops at Terminals 1, 2, 3, and B; the West Lot route only stops at Terminals 4, 5, 6, and 7; and the South Lot route stops at all terminals and also stops at the City Bus Center as Route C.

Transit buses 

Most transit buses operate from the LAX City Bus Center, which is located away from the Central Terminal Area on 96th Street, east of Sepulveda Boulevard.

LAX Shuttle route C offers free connections between the LAX City Bus Center and the Central Terminal Area.

During the overnight hours, Los Angeles Metro line  offers service to Downtown Los Angeles.

The LAX City Bus Center will eventually be replaced by the LAX/Metro Transit Center station, which will be connected to the rest of LAX by the Automated People Mover system.

There is also a bus stop at Sepulveda Boulevard and Century Boulevard that is a  walk away from Terminals 1 and 7/8 that is served by LADOT Commuter Express line  to Sylmar and Encino. This bus stop is also served by some of the same routes as the LAX City Bus Center: Los Angeles Metro lines 40 (overnight only), 117 and 232 and Torrance Transit line 8.

FlyAway Bus

The FlyAway bus is a nonstop motorcoach/shuttle service run by LAWA, which provides scheduled service between LAX and Union Station in Downtown LA or the FlyAway Terminal at the Van Nuys Airport in the San Fernando Valley.

FlyAway buses stop at every LAX terminal in a counter-clockwise direction, starting at terminal 1. The service hours vary based on the line, with most leaving on or near the top of the hour. Buses use the regional system of high-occupancy vehicle lanes and high-occupancy toll lanes (Metro ExpressLanes) to expedite their trips.

Metro Rail and the LAX Automated People Mover

LAX does not currently have a direct connection to the Los Angeles Metro Rail system.

The LAX Automated People Mover (APM), currently under construction by LAWA, is a  rail line that will connect the terminal area with long- and short-term parking facilities, a connection to the Los Angeles Metro Rail and other transit at the LAX/Metro Transit Center, and a consolidated facility for all airport rental car agencies.

The APM project is estimated to cost $5.5 billion and is scheduled to begin operation in 2023, with the connection to Metro Rail opening in 2024.

LAWA does not operate shuttles to get to the Metro K Line; however, one seeking to get to/from LAX and the K Line can travel to Aviation/LAX station on LAWA Route M (Metro Connector), and from there take the C and K Line Link (line 857) to Westchester/Veterans station while the rest of the K Line connecting to the APM is being built.

Freeways and roads
LAX's terminals are immediately west of the interchange between Century Boulevard and Sepulveda Boulevard (State Route 1). Interstate 405 can be reached to the east via Century Boulevard. Interstate 105 is to the south via Sepulveda Boulevard, through the Airport Tunnel that crosses under the airport runways.

Taxis, ride-share and private shuttles 

Arriving passengers take a shuttle or walk to the LAXit waiting area east of Terminal 1 for taxi or ride-share pickups. Taxicab services are operated by nine city-authorized taxi companies and regulated by Authorized Taxicab Supervision Inc. (ATS). ATS queues up taxis at the LAXit waiting area.

A number of private shuttle companies also offer limousine and bus services to LAX, including from suburban areas such as Lancaster, Palmdale, and Santa Clarita.  Bakersfield had a similar service to LAX, but it suspended operations during the 2020 pandemic.

Other facilities

The airport has the administrative offices of Los Angeles World Airports.

Continental Airlines once had its corporate headquarters on the airport property. At a 1962 press conference in the office of Mayor of Los Angeles Sam Yorty, Continental Airlines announced that it planned to move its headquarters to Los Angeles in July 1963. In 1963 Continental Airlines headquarters moved to a two-story, $2.3 million building on the grounds of the airport. The July 2009 Continental Magazine issue stated that the move "underlined Continental Airlines western and Pacific orientation". On July 1, 1983 the airline's headquarters were relocated to the America Tower in the Neartown area of Houston.

In addition to Continental Airlines, Western Airlines and Flying Tiger Line also had their headquarters at LAX.

Flight Path Museum LAX
The Flight Path Museum LAX, formerly known as the Flight Path Learning Center, is a museum located at 6661 Imperial Highway and was formerly known as the "West Imperial Terminal". This building used to house some charter flights. It sat empty for 10 years until it was re-opened as a learning center for LAX.

The center contains information on the history of aviation, several pictures of the airport, as well as aircraft scale models, flight attendant uniforms, and general airline memorabilia such as playing cards, china, magazines, signs, and a TWA gate information sign.

The museum's library contains an extensive collection of rare items such as aircraft manufacturer company newsletters/magazines, technical manuals for both military and civilian aircraft, industry magazines dating back to World War II and before, historic photographs and other invaluable references on aircraft operation and manufacturing.

The museum has on display "The Spirit of Seventy-Six," a DC-3 that flew in commercial airline service, before serving as a corporate aircraft for Union 76 Oil Company for 32 years. The plane was built in the Douglas Aircraft Company plant in Santa Monica in January 1941, which was a major producer of both commercial and military aircraft.

Accidents and incidents

During its history there have been numerous incidents, but only the most notable are summarized below:

1930s
 On January 23, 1939, the sole prototype Douglas 7B twin-engine attack bomber, designed and built as a company project, suffered a loss of the vertical fin and rudder during a demonstration flight over Mines Field, flat spun into the parking lot of North American Aviation, and burned. Another source states that the test pilot, in an attempt to impress the Gallic passenger, attempted a snap roll at low altitude with one engine feathered, resulting in a fatal spin. Douglas test pilot Johnny Cable bailed out at 300 feet, his chute unfurled but did not have time to deploy, he was killed on impact, the flight engineer John Parks rode in the airframe and died, but 33-year-old French Air Force Capt. Paul Chemidlin, riding in the aft fuselage near the top turret, survived with a broken leg, severe back injuries, and a slight concussion. The presence of Chemidlin, a representative of a foreign purchasing mission, caused a furor in Congress by isolationists over neutrality and export laws. The type was developed as the Douglas DB-7.

1940s
 On June 1, 1940, the first Douglas R3D-1 for the U.S. Navy, BuNo 1901, crashed at Mines Field, before delivery. The Navy later acquired the privately owned DC-5 prototype, from William E. Boeing as a replacement.
 On November 20, 1940, the prototype NA-73X Mustang, NX19998, first flown October 26, 1940, by test pilot Vance Breese, crashed. According to P-51 designer Edgar Schmued, the NA-73 was lost because test pilot Paul Balfour refused, before a high-speed test run, to go through the takeoff and flight test procedure with Schmued while the aircraft was on the ground, claiming "one airplane was like another". After making two high speed passes over Mines Field, he forgot to put the fuel valve on "reserve" and during the third pass ran out of fuel. An emergency landing in a freshly plowed field caused the wheels to dig in, the aircraft flipped over, the airframe was not rebuilt, the second aircraft being used for subsequent testing.
 On October 26, 1944, WASP pilot Gertrude Tompkins Silver of the 601st Ferrying Squadron, fifth Ferrying Group, Love Field, Dallas, Texas, departed Los Angeles Airport, in a North American P-51D Mustang, 44-15669, at 1600 hrs PWT, headed for the East Coast. She took off into the wind, into an offshore fog bank, and was expected that night at Palm Springs. She never arrived. Owing to a paperwork foul-up, a search did not get under way for several days, and while the eventual search of land and sea was massive, it failed to find a trace of Silver or her plane. She is the only missing WASP pilot. She had married Sgt. Henry Silver one month before her disappearance.

1950s
On June 30, 1956, United Airlines Flight 718 collided with TWA Flight 2 over the Grand Canyon, killing 128 people. Both aircraft departed LAX, with Flight 718 bound for Chicago Midway, and Flight 2 bound for Kansas City. The cause was found to be issued within the US air traffic control system and aviation law.

1960s
The aircraft was operating as flight SK933, nearing the completion of a flight from Seattle. Of nine crewmembers, three lost their lives to drowning, while 12 of the 36 passengers also drowned.
The aircraft was destroyed, resulting in the death of all 32 passengers and six crew members aboard.

1970s
 On the evening of June 6, 1971, Hughes Airwest Flight 706, a Douglas DC-9 jetliner that had departed LAX on a flight to Salt Lake City, Utah, was struck nine minutes after takeoff by a U.S. Marine Corps McDonnell Douglas F-4 Phantom II fighter jet over the San Gabriel Mountains. The midair collision killed all 44 passengers and five crew members aboard the DC-9 airliner and one of two crewmen aboard the military jet.
 On August 4, 1971, Continental Airlines Flight 712, a Boeing 707, collided in midair with a Cessna 150 over Compton. Although the Cessna was destroyed upon landing, there were no fatalities.
 On August 6, 1974, a bomb exploded near the Pan Am ticketing area at Terminal 2; three people were killed and 35 were injured.
 On March 1, 1978, two tires burst in succession on a McDonnell Douglas DC-10-10 on Continental Airlines Flight 603 during its takeoff roll at LAX and the plane, bound for Honolulu, veered off the runway. A third tire burst and the DC-10's left landing gear collapsed, causing a fuel tank to rupture. Following the aborted takeoff, spilled fuel ignited and enveloped the center portion of the aircraft in flames. During the ensuing emergency evacuation, a husband and wife died when they exited the passenger cabin onto the wing and dropped down directly into the flames. Two additional passengers died of their injuries approximately three months after the accident; 74 others aboard the plane were injured, as were 11 firemen battling the fire.
 On the evening of March 10, 1979, Swift Aire Flight 235, a twin-engine Aerospatiale Nord 262A-33 turboprop en route to Santa Maria, was forced to ditch in Santa Monica Bay after experiencing engine problems upon takeoff from LAX. The pilot, co-pilot, and a female passenger drowned when they were unable to exit the aircraft after the ditching. The female flight attendant and the three remaining passengers—two men and a pregnant woman—survived and were rescued by several pleasure boats and other watercraft in the vicinity.

1980s
 In January 1985, a woman was found dead in a suitcase that was lying on the baggage carousel for a while. The suitcase had arrived on a Lufthansa flight. The woman was later discovered to have been an Iranian citizen who had recently married another Iranian with UGreen card status. She had been denied a US visa in West Germany and therefore decided to enter the US in this way.
 On August 31, 1986, Aeroméxico Flight 498, a DC-9 en route from Mexico City, Mexico to Los Angeles, began its descent into LAX when a Piper Cherokee collided with the DC-9's left horizontal stabilizer over Cerritos, causing the DC-9 to crash into a residential neighborhood. All 67 people on the two aircraft were killed, in addition to 15 people on the ground. 5 homes were destroyed and an additional 7 were damaged by the crash and resulting fire. The Piper went down in a nearby schoolyard and caused no further injuries on the ground. As a result of this incident, the FAA required all commercial aircraft to be equipped with Traffic Collision Avoidance System (TCAS).

1990s
 On February 1, 1991, USAir Flight 1493 (arriving from Columbus, Ohio), a Boeing 737-300, landing on runway 24L at LAX, collided on a touchdown with a SkyWest Airlines Fairchild Metroliner, Flight 5569 departing to Palmdale. The Skywest plane was given clearance to wait on the runway for takeoff. The same controller then gave the USAir plane clearance to land on the same runway, forgetting that the SkyWest plane was there. The collision killed all 12 occupants of the SkyWest plane and 23 people aboard the USAir 737.

2000s
 Al-Qaeda attempted to bomb LAX on New Year's Eve 1999/2000. The bomber, Algerian Ahmed Ressam, was captured in Port Angeles, Washington, the U.S. port of entry, with a cache of explosives that could have produced a blast 40 times greater than that of a car bomb hidden in the trunk of the rented car in which he had traveled from Canada. He had planned to leave one or two suitcases filled with explosives in an LAX passenger waiting area. He was initially sentenced to 22 years in prison, but in February 2010 an appellate court ordered that his sentence be extended.
 On January 31, 2000, Alaska Airlines Flight 261, attempted to land at LAX after experiencing problems with its tail-mounted horizontal stabilizer.
 On September 11, 2001, American Airlines Flight 11, United Airlines Flight 175 and American Airlines Flight 77 were destined for LAX and they were hijacked mid-flight by Al-Qaeda terrorists. Flight 11 and Flight 175 deliberately crashed into the Twin Towers of World Trade Center and Flight 77 deliberately crashed into The Pentagon.
 In the 2002 Los Angeles International Airport shooting of July 4, 2002, Hesham Mohamed Hadayet killed two Israelis at the ticket counter of El Al Airlines at LAX. Although the gunman was not linked to any terrorist group, the man was upset at U.S. support for Israel, and therefore was motivated by political disagreement. This led the FBI to classify this shooting as a terrorist act, one of the first on U.S. soil since the September 11 attacks.
 On September 21, 2005, JetBlue Flight 292, an Airbus A320 discovered a problem with its landing gear as it took off from Bob Hope Airport in Burbank. It flew in circles for three hours to burn off fuel, then landed safely at Los Angeles International Airport on runway 25L, balancing on its back wheels as it rolled down the center of the runway. Passengers were able to watch their own coverage live from the satellite broadcast on JetBlue in-flight TV seat displays of their plane as it made an emergency landing with the front landing gear visibly becoming damaged. Because JetBlue did not serve LAX at the time, the aircraft was evaluated and repaired at a Continental Airlines hangar.
 On June 2, 2006, an American Airlines Boeing 767 was about to complete a flight from John F. Kennedy International Airport in New York City when the plane's pilots noted that the number 1 engine lagged the number 2 one by 2 percent. The plane landed safely and passengers disembarked, but when maintenance personnel retarded its throttle to idle, the number one engine, which had been put to maximum power, suffered an uncontained rupture of the high pressure turbine stage 1 disk, causing the engine to explode. There were no injuries among the three people on board the aircraft at the time (all of them maintenance workers), but the airplane was written off.   
 On July 29, 2006, after America West Express Flight 6008, a Canadair Regional Jet operated by Mesa Airlines from Phoenix, Arizona, landed on runway 25L, controllers instructed the pilot to leave the runway on a taxiway known as "Mike" and stop short of runway 25R. Even though the pilot read back the instructions correctly, he accidentally taxied onto 25R and into the path of a departing SkyWest Airlines Embraer EMB-120 operating United Express Flight 6037 to Monterey.
 On August 16, 2007, a runway incursion occurred between WestJet Flight 900 and Northwest Airlines Flight 180 on runways 24R and 24L, respectively, with the aircraft coming within  of each other. The planes were carrying a combined total of 296 people, none of whom were injured. The NTSB concluded that the incursion was the result of controller error. In September 2007, FAA Administrator Marion Blakey stressed the need for LAX to increase lateral separation between its pair of north runways in order to preserve the safety and efficiency of the airport.

2010s
 On October 13 and 14, 2013, two incidents of dry ice bomb explosions occurred at the airport. The first dry ice bomb exploded at 7:00 p.m. in an employee restroom in Terminal 2, with no injuries. Terminal 2 was briefly shut down as a result. On the next day at 8:30 p.m., a dry ice bomb exploded on the ramp area near the Tom Bradley International Terminal, also without injuries. Two other plastic bottles containing dry ice were found at the scene during the second explosion. On October 15, a 28-year-old airport employee was arrested in connection with the explosions and was booked on charges of possession of an explosive or destructive device near an aircraft. On October 18, a 41-year-old airport employee was arrested in connection with the second explosion, and was booked on suspicion of possessing a destructive device near an aircraft. Authorities believe that the incidents were not linked to terrorism. Both men subsequently pleaded no contest and were each sentenced to three years' probation. The airport workers had removed dry ice from a cargo hold into which a dog was to be loaded, because of fears that the dry ice could harm the animal.
 In the 2013 Los Angeles International Airport shooting of November 1, 2013, at around 9:31 a.m. PDT, a lone gunman entered Terminal 3 and opened fire with a semi-automatic rifle, killing a Transportation Security Administration (TSA) officer and wounding three other people. The gunman was later apprehended and taken into custody. Until the situation was clarified and under control, a few terminals at the airport were evacuated, all inbound flights were diverted and all outbound flights were grounded until the airport began returning to normal operation at around 2:30 p.m.
 On August 28, 2016, there was a false report of shots fired throughout the airport, causing a temporary lock down and about 3 hours of flight delays.
 On May 20, 2017, Aeroméxico Flight 642, a Boeing 737-800, collided with a utility truck on a taxiway near Runway 25R, injuring 8 people, two of them seriously.
 On July 25, 2018, jetblast from a Dash 8 caused some dollies to crash into a United 737.
 On November 21, 2019, Philippine Airlines Flight 113, operated by a Boeing 777-300ER suffered an engine compressor stall shortly after take off from the airport's Runway 25R, forcing the flight to return. The flight made a successful emergency landing just 13 minutes after departure. There were 342 passengers and 18 crew on board the flight, with no injuries reported.

2020s
 On August 19, 2020, FedEx Express Flight 1026, a Boeing 767, made an emergency landing when its left main landing gear failed to extend. One of the pilots was injured while leaving the aircraft.
 On October 28, 2021, more than 300 passengers were forced to flee onto the tarmac after report of a person with a gun at the Terminal 1. Two people were injured, and the flights were temporarily suspended. No weapons were found, but two people were arrested and taken into custody by the airport police.
On Friday, February 10, 2023, an American Airlines A320 aircraft was being towed without any passengers when it collided with a passenger bus, injuring five people who were riding on the bus.

Aircraft spotting
The "Imperial Hill" area of El Segundo is a prime location for aircraft spotting, especially for takeoffs. Part of the Imperial Hill area has been set aside as a city park, Clutter's Park.

Another popular spotting location sits under the final approach for runways 24 L&R on a lawn next to the Westchester In-N-Out Burger on Sepulveda Boulevard. This is one of the few remaining locations in Southern California from which spotters may watch such a wide variety of low-flying commercial airliners from directly underneath a flight path.

One can also do aircraft spotting at a small park in the take-off pattern that (normally) goes out over the Pacific. The park is on the east side of the street Vista Del Mar from where it takes its name, Vista Del Mar Park.

Space Shuttle Endeavour
At 12:51 p.m. on Friday, September 21, 2012, a Shuttle Carrier Aircraft carrying the Space Shuttle Endeavour landed at LAX on runway 25L. An estimated 10,000 people saw the shuttle land. Interstate 105 was backed up for miles at a standstill. Imperial Highway was shut down for spectators. It was quickly taken off the Shuttle Carrier Aircraft, a modified Boeing 747, and was moved to a United Airlines hangar. The shuttle spent about a month in the hangar while it was prepared to be transported to the California Science Center.

In popular culture

Numerous films and television shows have been set or filmed partially at LAX, at least partly due to the airport's proximity to Hollywood studios and Los Angeles. Film shoots at the Los Angeles airports, including LAX, produced $590 million for the Los Angeles region from 2002 to 2005.

See also

 California World War II Army Airfields
 List of airports in the Los Angeles area
 Metro
 Los Angeles Airport Police
 Peirson Mitchell Hall

References

Further reading
 Bullock, Freddy. LAX: Los Angeles International Airport (1998)
 Schoneberger, William A., Ethel Pattison, and Lee Nichols. Los Angeles International Airport (Arcadia Publishing, 2009.)

External links

 Los Angeles International Airport official website
 LAneXt website
 LAX Noise Management Internet Flight Tracking System
 
 

 View of LAX runways from inside air traffic control tower, California, 1986. Los Angeles Times Photographic Archive (Collection 1429). UCLA Library Special Collections, Charles E. Young Research Library, University of California, Los Angeles.

 
1930 establishments in California
Airfields of the United States Army Air Forces Air Transport Command in North America
Airfields of the United States Army Air Forces in California
Airports established in 1930
Airports in Los Angeles County, California
Transportation buildings and structures in Los Angeles
Westchester, Los Angeles
Airports in California